Thelymitra crenulata is a species of orchid in the family Orchidaceae and is endemic to a small area of South Australia. It has a single, fleshy linear leaf and up to seven deep blue flowers with darker lines. It was only discovered in 2003, but is sometimes common in its range near Mount Gambier after wet weather in spring.

Description
The lobe on the top of the anther is tube-shaped, curved forwards and dark brown with a yellow tip. The side lobes curve sharply upwards and have mop-like tufts of white hairs on their ends. The flowers open for only a short period on warm, sunny days. Flowering occurs between late October and mid-November but often for only a week. Flowering is more prolific after a wet spring.

Taxonomy and naming
Thelymitra crenulata was first formally described in 2010 by Robert Bates from a specimen he collected near Glencoe in 2003. The description was published in the Journal of the Adelaide Botanic Garden. The specific epithet (crenulata) is a Latin word meaning "minutely crenate, referring to the crinkled anther lobe.

Distribution and habitat
Thelymitra crenulata grows in disturbed areas such as firebreaks and tracks in heath near waterholes. It is only known from near Mount Gambier.

References

crenulata
Endemic orchids of Australia
Orchids of South Australia
Plants described in 2010